Haszaimi Bol Hassan is the 12th Commander of the Royal Brunei Armed Forces (RBAF) since 2022. He previously held the position of the 11th Commander of the Royal Brunei Land Forces (RBLF) from 2020 to 2022.

Education
Throughout his career, he was sent to several training institutes which include the Officer Cadet School, Waiouru, New Zealand in 1994, the Intermediate Staff Course (ISC) at the Land Warfare Centre, Canungra, Australia in 1999, the Australian Command and Staff Course (ACSC) at the Australian Defence College, Canberra, Australia in 2007, Royal College of Defence Studies (RCDS), London, England from 2012 to 2013, Stanford-NUS Executive Development in International Management, Singapore in August 2015, attended the Senior Executives in National and International Security at the Harvard Kennedy School, United States in 2016.

Military career
In June 1993, he enlisted into the RBAF and graduated with the rank of second lieutenant. Muhammad Haszaimi became a Infantry Platoon Commander in the Third Battalion RBLF, followed by several other appointments including a Mortar Platoon Commander, Adjutant, Infantry Company Commander and Officer Commanding at the School of Infantry. Moreover, he was an instructor for non-commissioned officers and junior commissioned officers at the Training Institute RBAF.

Upon his return from Australia, the Ministry of Defence would post him as the Military Assistant to the Deputy Minister of Defence in 2008. In 2010, he would then be promoted to the rank of lieutenant colonel while as the commandant of the Second Battalion RBLF from 2009 to 2011. That following year, he became a Military Assistant to the 8th Commander of RBAF, Aminuddin Ihsan. Graduating from RCDS, he would then be posted to the chief of staff of the RBLF in September 2013, and in May 2014, promoted to a rank of colonel.

From 2014 to 2018, he would become the deputy commander of the RBLF and later that year, assumed command of the Training Institue RBAF. After this, his command would then again be changed to the Defence Academy RBAF. Afterwards, Colonel Haszaimi was again promoted to the rank of brigadier general on 24 July 2020 and six days later, became the 11th Commander of the RBLF. During the farewell to Lt. Col. Dan Hauser, the Australian Defence Adviser to Brunei Darussalam, Commander Haszaimi showed his appreciation to his service in upholding cooperations between the two nations. He would be succeeded by Abdul Razak Abdul Kadir on 1 March 2022.

On 1 March 2022, he was finally promoted to major general and appointed by Sultan Hassanal Bolkiah to be the 12th Commander of the RBAF during a ceremony held at the Istana Nurul Iman, Bandar Seri Begawan.

Personal life
Muhammad Haszaimi is married to Ummisyafinah binti Haji Zaini and has four children together. In addition, he enjoys reading in his free time.

Honours

National 

  Order of Pahlawan Negara Brunei First Class (PSPNB) – Dato Seri Pahlawan (15 July 2021)
  Order of Paduka Keberanian Laila Terbilang First Class (DPKT) – Dato Paduka Seri (15 July 2022)
  Order of Seri Paduka Mahkota Brunei Third Class (SMB) – (2012)
  Pingat Indah Kerja Baik (PIKB) – (2005)
  Golden Jubilee Medal – (5 October 2017)
  General Service Medal (Armed Forces)
  Long Service Medal (Armed Forces)
  Royal Brunei Armed Forces Golden Jubilee Medal – (31 May 2011)

Foreign 

 :
  Pingat Jasa Gemilang (PJG) – (14 June 2022)

 :
  Order of Military Service Courageous Commander (PGAT) – (18 October 2022)

References

Living people
Harvard Kennedy School alumni
Year of birth missing (living people)
Bruneian military leaders